Sammie Moreels (born 27 November 1965) is a Belgian former professional racing cyclist. He rode in three editions of the Tour de France.

Major results

1984
 3rd Road race, National Junior Road Championships 
1988
 1st Stage 4a Circuit Cycliste Sarthe
 2nd Kattekoers
1989
 1st Grand Prix d'Isbergues
 1st Stage 5 Tour du Vaucluse
 2nd Paris–Camembert
 4th La Flèche Wallonne
 5th Liège–Bastogne–Liège
 6th Paris–Tours
 8th GP Villafranca de Ordizia
 8th Overall Tour de la Communauté Européenne
 9th Wincanton Classic
1990
 1st Stage 2 Tour of Galicia
 2nd GP Stad Zottegem
 3rd GP des Amériques
 7th Wincanton Classic
1991
 1st Cholet-Pays de Loire
 1st GP du Canton d'Argovie
 3rd Gran Piemonte
 3rd Grand Prix de Wallonie
 3rd Milano–Torino
 5th Rund um den Henninger Turm
 5th GP Stad Zottegem
 9th Giro di Lombardia
1992
 1st Trofeo Laigueglia
 3rd Grand Prix de Wallonie
 4th Overall Tour du Haut Var
 5th Overall Vuelta a los Valles Mineros
1993
 1st Kampioenschap van Vlaanderen
 1st Stage 4 Vuelta a Andalucía
 9th Paris–Brussels
1994
 7th GP Stad Zottegem
1995
 3rd Grand Prix d'Isbergues
 10th Grand Prix de Wallonie
1996
 10th Le Samyn

References

External links

1965 births
Living people
Belgian male cyclists
Sportspeople from Ghent
Cyclists from East Flanders